João Manuel Mena Barreto was a Brazilian Brigadier throughout the Uruguayan War and Paraguayan War. He was known for his service at the Battle of São Borja, rescuing the civilian populace from the Paraguayan forces before getting killed at the Battle of Piribebuy.

Biography
He married Maria Balbina Palmeiro da Fontoura, on August 27, 1849.

He participated in the Uruguayan War, being promoted to colonel, by merit, on February 18, 1865 after the Siege of Paysandú.

He was then to Paraguay in the first half of 1865 as the commander of the 1st Battalion of Volunteers for the Homeland, as he was informed of the invasion of Rio Grande do Sul near São Borja. The Paraguayans' decision to only take São Borja after crossing the river with only five thousand men and was caused by the impression that the soldiers were a vanguard of the Imperial Brazilian Army. Colonel João Manuel took advantage of this to effect, at night, the strategic withdrawal of all the families from São Borja and was praised for this.

He later took part in the Siege of Uruguaiana, shortly after taking command of a brigade stationed at São Gabriel.

He was later called to court, where he commanded the 1st Guard Regiment. He did not stay long as he wished to return to combat and was promoted to Brigadier in 1867. In November and December of the same year he excelled in combat, later fighting in battles of the Avay and Lomas Valentinas.

His death infuriated the Count of Eu, who ordered the beheading of Colonel Pablo Caballero and the political chief of the village, Patrício Marecos, demonstrating the influence of the Menna Barreto in southern Brazil.

Awards
Medal of the Oriental State Campaign (1851 - 1852)
Order of Christ, knight (1858)
Order of São Bento de Aviz, knight (1860)
, knight (1860)
Order of the Cruzeiro, officer ( 1865 ) 
Order of the Rose ( 1869 )

Foreign Awards
: Medalha de Mérito Militar

References

Bibliography
 MENNA BARRETO, João de Deus Noronha. Os Menna Barreto. Seis Gerações de Soldados. Rio de Janeiro: Laemmert, 1950.
 MENNA BARRETO,Oswaldo Bittencourt. Família Menna Barreto 200 Anos. Santa Maria: Cedigraf, 2003.

1824 births
1869 deaths
Marshals of Brazil
Brazilian military personnel of the Paraguayan War
Brazilian military personnel killed in action
People from Porto Alegre